Shir Kola (also Romanized as Shīr Kolā and Shīrkalā) is a village in Zarem Rud Rural District, Hezarjarib District, Neka County, Mazandaran Province, Iran. At the 2006 census, its population was 275, in 70 families.

References 

Populated places in Neka County